The Ethical movement, also referred to as the Ethical Culture movement, Ethical Humanism or simply Ethical Culture, is an ethical, educational, and religious movement that is usually traced back to Felix Adler (1851–1933). Individual chapter organizations are generically referred to as "Ethical Societies", though their names may include "Ethical Society", "Ethical Culture Society", "Society for Ethical Culture", "Ethical Humanist Society", or other variations on the theme of "Ethical".

The Ethical movement is an outgrowth of secular moral traditions in the 19th century, principally in Europe and the United States. While some in this movement went on to organize for a secular humanist movement, others attempted to build a secular moral movement that was emphatically "religious" in its approach to developing humanist ethical codes, in the sense of encouraging congregational structures and religious rites and practices. While in the United States, these movements formed as separate education organizations (the American Humanist Association and the American Ethical Union), the American Ethical Union's British equivalents, the South Place Ethical Society and the British Ethical Union consciously moved away from a congregational model to become Conway Hall and Humanists UK respectively. Subsequent "godless" congregational movements include the Sunday Assembly, whose London chapter has used Conway Hall as a venue since 2013.

At the international level, Ethical Culture and secular humanist groups have always organized jointly; the American Ethical Union and British Ethical Union were founding members of Humanists International, whose original name "International Humanist and Ethical Union" reflected the movement's unity.

Ethical Culture is premised on the idea that honoring and living in accordance with ethical principles is central to what it takes to live meaningful and fulfilling lives, and to creating a world that is good for all. Practitioners of Ethical Culture focus on supporting one another in becoming better people, and on doing good in the world.

History

Background
The Ethical movement was an outgrowth of the general loss of faith among the intellectuals of the Victorian era. A precursor to the doctrines of the Ethical movement can be found in the South Place Ethical Society, founded in 1793 as the South Place Chapel on Finsbury Square, on the edge of the City of London.

In the early nineteenth century, the chapel became known as "a radical gathering-place". At that point it was a Unitarian chapel, and that movement, like Quakers, supported female equality. Under the leadership of Reverend William Johnson Fox (who became minister of the congregation in 1817), it lent its pulpit to activists such as Anna Wheeler, one of the first women to campaign for feminism at public meetings in England, who spoke in 1829 on "Rights of Women." In later decades, the chapel moved away from Unitarianism, changing its name first to the South Place Religious Society, then the South Place Ethical Society (a name it held formally, though it was better known as Conway Hall from 1929) and is now Conway Hall Ethical Society.

The Fellowship of the New Life was established in 1883 by the Scottish intellectual Thomas Davidson. Fellowship members included poets Edward Carpenter and John Davidson, animal rights activist Henry Stephens Salt, sexologist Havelock Ellis, feminist Edith Lees (who later married Ellis), novelist Olive Schreiner and Edward R. Pease.

Its objective was "The cultivation of a perfect character in each and all." They wanted to transform society by setting an example of clean simplified living for others to follow. Davidson was a major proponent of a structured philosophy about religion, ethics, and social reform.

At a meeting on 16 November 1883, a summary of the society's goals was drawn up by Maurice Adams:

Although the Fellowship was a short-lived organization, it spawned the Fabian Society, which split in 1884 from the Fellowship of the New Life.

In the United States

In his youth, Felix Adler was being trained to be a rabbi like his father, Samuel Adler, the rabbi of the Reform Jewish Temple Emanu-El in New York. As part of his education, he enrolled at the University of Heidelberg, where he was influenced by neo-Kantian philosophy. He was especially drawn to the Kantian ideas that one could not prove the existence or non-existence of deities or immortality and that morality could be established independently of theology.

During this time he was also exposed to the moral problems caused by the exploitation of women and labor.  These experiences laid the intellectual groundwork for the Ethical movement.  Upon his return from Germany, in 1873, he shared his ethical vision with his father's congregation in the form of a sermon. Due to the negative reaction he elicited it became his first and last sermon as a rabbi in training. Instead he took up a professorship at Cornell University and in 1876 gave a follow up sermon that led to the 1877 founding of the New York Society for Ethical Culture, which was the first of its kind. By 1886, similar societies had sprouted up in Philadelphia, Chicago and St. Louis.

These societies all adopted the same statement of principles:
The belief that morality is independent of theology;
The affirmation that new moral problems have arisen in modern industrial society which have not been adequately dealt with by the world's religions;
The duty to engage in philanthropy in the advancement of morality;
The belief that self-reform should go in lock step with social reform;
The establishment of republican rather than monarchical governance of Ethical societies
The agreement that educating the young is the most important aim.
In effect, the movement responded to the religious crisis of the time by replacing theology with unadulterated morality. It aimed to "disentangle moral ideas from religious doctrines, metaphysical systems, and ethical theories, and to make them an independent force in personal life and social relations." Adler was also particularly critical of the religious emphasis on creed, believing it to be the source of sectarian bigotry.  He therefore attempted to provide a universal fellowship devoid of ritual and ceremony, for those who would otherwise be divided by creeds. For the same reasons the movement also adopted a neutral position on religious beliefs, advocating neither atheism nor theism, agnosticism nor deism.

The Adlerian emphasis on "deed not creed" translated into several public service projects.  The year after it was founded, the New York society started a kindergarten, a district nursing service and a tenement-house building company. Later they opened the Ethical Culture School, then called the "Workingman's School," a Sunday school and a summer home for children, and other Ethical societies soon followed suit with similar projects.  Unlike the philanthropic efforts of the established religious institutions of the time, the Ethical societies did not attempt to proselytize those they helped.  In fact, they rarely attempted to convert anyone.  New members had to be sponsored by existing members, and women were not allowed to join at all until 1893.  They also resisted formalization, though nevertheless slowly adopted certain traditional practices, like Sunday meetings and life cycle ceremonies, yet did so in a modern humanistic context.  In 1893, the four existing societies unified under the umbrella organization, the American Ethical Union (AEU).

After some initial success the movement stagnated until after World War II. In 1946 efforts were made to revitalize and societies were created in New Jersey and Washington D.C., along with the inauguration of the Encampment for Citizenship. By 1968 there were thirty societies with a total national membership of over 5,500. However, the resuscitated movement differed from its predecessor in a few ways. The newer groups were being created in suburban locales and often to provide alternative Sunday schools for children, with adult activities as an afterthought.

There was also a greater focus on organization and bureaucracy, along with an inward turn emphasizing the needs of the group members over the more general social issues that had originally concerned Adler. The result was a transformation of American ethical societies into something much more akin to small Christian congregations in which the minister's most pressing concern is to tend to his or her flock.

In the 21st century, the movement continued to revitalize itself through social media and involvement with other Humanist organizations, with mixed success. As of 2014, there were fewer than 10,000 official members of the Ethical movement.

In Britain

In 1885 the ten-year-old American Ethical Culture movement helped to stimulate similar social activity in Great Britain, when American sociologist John Graham Brooks distributed pamphlets by Chicago ethical society leader William Salter to a group of British philosophers, including Bernard Bosanquet, John Henry Muirhead, and John Stuart MacKenzie.

One of Felix Adler's colleagues, Stanton Coit, visited them in London to discuss the "aims and principles" of their American counterparts. In 1886 the first British ethical society was founded. Coit took over the leadership of South Place for a few years. Ethical societies flourished in Britain. By 1896 the four London societies formed the Union of Ethical Societies, and between 1905 and 1910 there were over fifty societies in Great Britain, seventeen of which were affiliated with the Union. Part of this rapid growth was due to Coit, who left his role as leader of South Place in 1892 after being denied the power and authority he was vying for.

Because he was firmly entrenched in British ethicism, Coit remained in London and formed the West London Ethical Society, which was almost completely under his control. Coit worked quickly to shape the West London society not only around Ethical Culture but also the trappings of religious practice, renaming the society in 1914 to the Ethical Church; he did this because he subscribed to a personal theory of using "theological terms in a humanistic sense" in order to make the Ethical movement appealing to irreligious people with otherwise strong cultural attachments to religion, such as cultural Christians. Coit transformed his meetings into "services", and their space into something akin to a church. In a series of books Coit also began to argue for the transformation of the Anglican Church into an Ethical Church, while holding up the virtue of ethical ritual.  He felt that the Anglican Church was in the unique position to harness the natural moral impulse that stemmed from society itself, as long as the Church replaced theology with science, abandoned supernatural beliefs, expanded its bible to include a cross-cultural selection of ethical literature and reinterpreted its creeds and liturgy in light of modern ethics and psychology.  His attempt to reform the Anglican church failed, and ten years after his death in 1944, the Ethical Church building was sold to the Roman Catholic Church.

During Stanton Coit's lifetime, the Ethical Church never officially affiliated with the Union of Ethical Societies, nor did South Place. In 1920 the Union of Ethical Societies changed its name to the Ethical Union. Harold Blackham, who had taken over leadership of the London Ethical Church, consciously sought to remove the church-like trappings of the Ethical movement, and advocated a simple creed of humanism that was not akin to a religion. He promoted the merger of the Ethical Union with the Rationalist Press Association and the South Place Ethical Society, and, in 1957, a Humanist Council was set up to explore amalgamation. Although issues over charitable status prevented a full amalgamation, the Ethical Union under Blackham changed its name in 1967 to become the British Humanist Association – establishing humanism as the principle organizing force for non-religious morals and secularist advocacy in Britain. The BHA was the legal successor body to the Union of Ethical Societies.

Between 1886 and 1927 seventy-four ethical societies were started in Great Britain, although this rapid growth did not last long.  The numbers declined steadily throughout the 1920s and early 30s, until there were only ten societies left in 1934. By 1954 there were only four. The situation became such that in 1971, sociologist Colin Campbell even suggested that one could say, "that when the South Place Ethical Society discussed changing its name to the South Place Humanist society in 1969, the English Ethical movement ceased to exist."

The organizations spawned by the 19th century Ethical movement would later live on as the British humanist movement. The South Place Ethical Society eventually changed its name Conway Hall Ethical Society, after Moncure D. Conway, and is typically known as simply "Conway Hall". In 2017, the British Humanist Association again changed its name, becoming Humanists UK. Both organizations are part of Humanists International, which had been founded by Harold Blackham in 1952 as the International Humanist and Ethical Union.

Ethical perspective

While Ethical Culturists generally share common beliefs about what constitutes ethical behavior and the good, individuals are encouraged to develop their own personal understanding of these ideas. This does not mean that Ethical Culturists condone moral relativism, which would relegate ethics to mere preferences or social conventions. Ethical principles are viewed as being related to deep truths about the way the world works, and hence not arbitrary. However, it is recognized that complexities render the understanding of ethical nuances subject to continued dialogue, exploration, and learning.

While the founder of Ethical Culture, Felix Adler, was a transcendentalist, Ethical Culturists may have a variety of understandings as to the theoretical origins of ethics. Key to the founding of Ethical Culture was the observation that too often disputes over religious or philosophical doctrines have distracted people from actually living ethically and doing good. Consequently, "Deed before creed" has long been a motto of the movement.

Organizational model 

Functionally, the Ethical Societies were organized in a similar manner to churches or synagogues and are headed by "leaders" as clergy. Their founders had suspected this would be a successful model for spreading secular morality. As a result, an Ethical Society typically would have Sunday morning meetings, offer moral instruction for children and teens, and do charitable work and social action. They may offer a variety of educational and other programs. They conduct weddings, commitment ceremonies, baby namings, and memorial services.

Individual Ethical Society members may or may not believe in a deity or regard Ethical Culture as their religion. Felix Adler said "Ethical Culture is religious to those who are religiously minded, and merely ethical to those who are not so minded."  The movement does consider itself a religion in the sense that

The Ethical Culture 2003 ethical identity statement states:

Since around 1950 the Ethical Culture movement has been increasingly identified as part of the modern Humanist movement. Specifically, in 1952, the American Ethical Union, the national umbrella organization for Ethical Culture societies in the United States, became one of the founding member organizations of the International Humanist and Ethical Union.

In the United Kingdom, the ethical societies consciously rejected the "church model" in the mid-20th century, while still providing services like weddings, funerals, and namings on a secular basis.

Key ideas
While Ethical Culture does not regard its founder's views as necessarily the final word, Adler identified focal ideas that remain important within Ethical Culture. These ideas include:

 Human Worth and Uniqueness – All people are taken to have inherent worth, not dependent on the value of what they do. They are deserving of respect and dignity, and their unique gifts are to be encouraged and celebrated.
 Eliciting the Best – "Always act so as to Elicit the best in others, and thereby yourself" is as close as Ethical Culture comes to having a Golden Rule.
 Inter-relatedness – Adler used the term The Ethical Manifold to refer to his conception of the universe as made up of myriad unique and indispensable moral agents (individual human beings), each of whom has an inestimable influence on all the others. In other words, we are all interrelated, with each person playing a role in the whole and the whole affecting each person. Our Inter-relatedness is at the heart of ethics.

Many Ethical Societies prominently display a sign that says "The Place Where People Meet to Seek the Highest is Holy Ground".

Locations
The largest concentration of Ethical Societies is in the New York metropolitan area, including Societies in New York, Manhattan, the Bronx, Brooklyn, Queens, Westchester and Nassau County; and New Jersey, such as Bergen and Essex Counties, New Jersey.

Ethical Societies exist in several U.S. cities and counties, including Austin, Texas; Baltimore; Chapel Hill; Asheville, North Carolina; Chicago; San Jose, California; Philadelphia; St. Louis; St. Peters, Missouri; Washington, D.C.; Lewisburg, Pennsylvania, and Vienna, Virginia.

Ethical Societies also exist outside the U.S. Conway Hall in London is home to the South Place Ethical Society, which was founded in 1787.

Structure and events
Ethical societies are typically led by "Leaders". Leaders are trained and certified (the equivalent of ordination) by the American Ethical Union.  Societies engage Leaders, in much the same way that Protestant congregations "call" a minister. Not all Ethical societies have a professional Leader. (In typical usage, the Ethical movement uses upper case to distinguish certified professional Leaders from other leaders.) A board of executives handles day-to-day affairs, and committees of members focus on specific activities and involvements of the society.

Ethical societies usually hold weekly meetings on Sundays, with the main event of each meeting being the "Platform", which involves a half-hour speech by the Leader of the Ethical Society, a member of the society or by guests. Sunday school for minors is also held at most ethical societies concurrent with the Platform.

The American Ethical Union holds an annual AEU Assembly bringing together Ethical societies from across the US.

Legal challenges
The tax status of Ethical Societies as religious organizations has been upheld in court cases in Washington, D.C. (1957), and in Austin, Texas (2003). In challenge to a denial of tax-exempt status, the Texas State Appeals Court decided that "the Comptroller's test was unconstitutionally underinclusive and that the Ethical Society should have qualified for the requested tax exemptions... Because the Comptroller's test fails to include the whole range of belief systems that may, in our diverse and pluralistic society, merit the First Amendment's protection..."

Advocates
British Prime Minister Ramsay MacDonald was a strong supporter of the British Ethical movement, having been a Christian earlier in his life. He was a member of the Ethical Church and the Union of Ethical Societies (now Humanists UK), a regular attender at South Place Ethical Society. During his time involved with the Ethical movement, he chaired the annual meeting of the Ethical Union on multiple occasions and wrote for Stanton Coit's Ethical World journal.

The British critic and mountaineer Leslie Stephen was a prominent supporter of Ethical Culture in the UK, serving multiple terms as President of the West London Ethical Society, and was involved in the creation of the Union of Ethical Societies.

Albert Einstein was a supporter of Ethical Culture. On the seventy-fifth anniversary of the New York Society for Ethical Culture, in 1951, he noted that the idea of Ethical Culture embodied his personal conception of what is most valuable and enduring in religious idealism. Humanity requires such a belief to survive, Einstein argued. He observed, "Without 'ethical culture' there is no salvation for humanity."

First Lady Eleanor Roosevelt was a regular attendee at the New York Society for Ethical Culture at a time when humanism was beginning to coalesce in its modern-day form, and it was there that she developed friendships with the leading humanists and Ethical Culturists of her day. She collaborated with Al Black, Ethical Society leader, in the creation of her nationwide Encampment of Citizenship. She maintained her involvement with the movement as figures on both sides of the Atlantic began to advocate for organizing under the banner of secular humanism. She provided a cover endorsement for the first edition of Humanism as the Next Step (1954) by Lloyd and Mary Morain, saying simply that it was "A significant book."

See also
 Arthur E. Briggs, Los Angeles City Council member, 1939–41, Ethical Society leader
 British Humanist Association, which inherited many British ethical societies
 International Moral Education Congress
 Religious humanism
 Unitarian Universalism
 Washington Ethical Society v. District of Columbia

References

Sources

Further reading
 Ericson, Edward L. The Humanist Way: An Introduction to Ethical Humanist Religion. A Frederick Ungar book, The Continuum Publishing Company. 205 pages, 1988.
 Muzzey, David Saville. Ethics as a Religion, 273 pages, 1951, 1967, 1986.
 Radest, Howard. Toward Common Ground: The Story of the Ethical Societies in the United States. Ungar, 1969

External links

 

 
1877 establishments in the United States
Ethics
Humanism
Nontheism
Philosophical schools and traditions